is a Japanese corporate group consisting of three core companies Seiko Group Corp. (Seiko), Seiko Instruments Inc. (SII) and Seiko Epson Corp (Epson). The three companies are linked by a common thread of timepiece technology. Epson has established its own brand image and rarely uses 'Seiko'. On January 26, 2009, Seiko Holdings and Seiko Instruments announced that the two companies will be merged on October 1, 2009, through a share swap. Seiko Instruments became a wholly-owned subsidiary of Seiko Holdings on October 1, 2009. On May 10, 2022, Seiko Holdings Corporation announced that it would rename Seiko Group Corporation as of October 1, 2022.

Seiko Watch Corp., a subsidiary of Seiko Holdings Corp., markets SEIKO watches while Seiko Instruments Inc. and Seiko Epson Corp. manufacture their movements.

Time Module (TMI), a member of the Seiko Group, was established in 1987 with funding from Seiko Watch Company, Seiko Instruments Inc., and Seiko Epson Corp. to manufacture watch movements.

Seiko Holdings Corporation (SEIKO, headquartered in Tokyo)
Seiko Watch Corporation (marketing watches)
Seiko Clock Inc. (development, manufacturing, sales and repair of clocks)
Seiko Sports Life Co., Ltd. (golf clubs, stopwatches, etc.)
Seiko Time Systems Inc. (system clocks, etc.)
Seiko Service Center Co., Ltd. (repair and after service for watches) 
Seiko Business Services Inc. (general affairs & human resources)
Seiko Precision Inc. (electronic/micromechatronics devices, printers, information equipment, system clocks and production equipment, etc.)
Seiko NPC Corporation (semiconductors)
Seiko Jewelry Co., Ltd. (jewelry)
Seiko Optical Products Co., Ltd. (eyeglasses - lenses & frames)
Ohara Inc. (specialty optical glass; Seiko owns 32.2% )
Wako Co., Ltd. (upscale specialty retailer) 
Cronos Inc. (upscale specialty retailer) 
etc.
Seiko Instruments Inc. (SII, Subsidiary of Seiko Holdings, headquartered in Chiba)
SII NanoTechnology Inc.
Morioka Seiko Instruments Inc.
SII Network Systems Inc.
SII Mobile Communications Inc.
SII Data Service Corp.
SII Printek Inc.
SII Microtechno Inc.
SII Micro Parts Ltd.
SII Micro Precision Inc.
Epolead Services Inc.
Seiko I Infotech Inc.
Seiko I Techno Research Co., Ltd.
Seiko EG&G Co., Ltd.
City Service Co., Ltd.
SII Crystal Technologies, Ltd.
etc.
Seiko Epson Corporation (EPSON, headquartered in Suwa, Nagano)
Epson Sales Japan Corporation
Miyazaki Epson Corporation
Epson Direct Corporation
Epson Service Corporation
Epson Atmix Corporation
Epson Software Development Laboratory Inc.
Yasu Semiconductor Corporation
Seiko Epson Contact Lens Corporation
Seiko Lens Service Center Corporation
Epson Imaging Devices Corporation
Orient Watch
Trume Watch
etc.

See also

Seikosha
Astron (wristwatch)

References

External links
Seiko Holdings Corporation
Seiko Instruments Inc.
Seiko Epson Corporation

Holding companies of Japan
Watchmaking conglomerates
Defense companies of Japan
Multinational companies headquartered in Japan
Seiko